Ethics Since 1900 is a  1960 book by the philosopher Mary Warnock, Baroness Warnock, in which the author provides an account of the history of ethics in the 20th century.

Reception
A. C. Ewing, Paul Welsh and James D. Bastable have reviewed the book.

References 

1960 non-fiction books
Oxford University Press books
English-language books
Ethics books